Trans-Swiss Trail is a long-distance hiking trail in Switzerland.  It starts in Porrentruy in the north near the French border, and cuts south over the Alps to finish in Lugano.

Passing through French, German and Italian-speaking areas of Switzerland, the route covers approximately 460km through a wide variety of landscapes, with altitudes between 235m (in Bellinzona) to over 2000m (on the Gotthard pass).

The route is marked with green signposts with the number "2", part of the new national signposting scheme.

External links
 http://www.wanderland.ch/en/changelanguage.cfm?path=%2Frouten%2Froute&pid=167336&nid=55467&place=&etappe=&id=2&sw=
 http://www.wandersite.ch/TransSwissTrail.html

Hiking trails in Switzerland